, also known as AkaAka, is a Japanese visual novel that has been adapted into a manga series. The manga is published in English by Yen Press.

Characters

His real name is Akashi Tsubaki.

Media

Game
The original visual novel was released as a PC game on 3 May 2011. It was created by the dōjin group HaccaWorks*, a group consisting of Kanan Misaki, Mizuki Satoru, Yumi Riku, Yumekagami Misaki, and Warabe Yuta. The theme song, was performed by Akiko Shikata of Frontier Works. It was later re-released for PlayStation Portable in 2014.

Manga
A manga adaptation by Nanao was serialized in Media Factory's Monthly Comic Gene from 15 February 2012 to 15 June 2016. The series is licensed for English publication in North America by Yen Press.

Volumes

References

External links

  at HaccaWorks* 
 

Dark fantasy anime and manga
Doujin video games
Media Factory manga
PlayStation Portable games
Shōjo manga
Visual novels
Yen Press titles